Abacetus asmarensis is a species of ground beetle in the subfamily Pterostichinae. It was described by Jedlicka in 1956 and is an endemic species found in Afghanistan.

References

asmarensis
Beetles described in 1956
Insects of Western Asia